Dog walking is the act of a person walking with a dog, typically from the dog's residence and then returning. Leashes are commonly used for this. Both owners and pets receive many benefits, including exercise and companionship.

Description

Dogs are restrained by a collar around their neck or a Harness, or by simply following their guardian with familiarity and verbal control. Commonly, the dog is walked by the guardian or another family member, but there are also professional dog walkers.

Dog owners can also go hiking with their dogs. Many trails mandate that the dogs are on leash, in view of the dogs' safety and safety of other hikers.

Health benefits

A study by Michigan State University showed that people who walk their dogs are 34% more likely to meet expected levels of exercise, with a recommended level of 150 minutes of activity such as dog walking per week. Matthew Reeves, the co-author of the study said, "There is no magic bullet in getting people to reach those benchmarks but walking a dog has a measurable impact."

Research conducted by the University of Western Australia has suggested that a higher rate of dog walking within a community tends to cause more interpersonal relationships within that community. The research suggested that people in the community would acknowledge and greet other people in the street, and exchange favors with neighbors, which could possibly encourage more exercise in the community, by giving pets and owners a chance at a healthier lifestyle.

Professional dog walkers

Professional dog walkers, both individuals and businesses, are paid by dog owners to walk their dogs for them. Some dog walkers will take many dogs for a walk at once, while others will only take a single dog. The length of a walk might vary by breed or owner's request, ranging from short walks intended to last no longer than the time it takes for the dog to relieve itself of waste, to longer walks with a specific amount of time set by the owner.
The length of walks should take into account the dog's age and health status. Long walks (over 1 hour) should not be undertaken by dogs under 12 months of age for smaller breeds, up to 18 months for large breeds, to protect their bones and joints while they are still growing. Also growing in popularity is "dog running". Dog runners are professionals who run with dogs, rather than walking with them. In some jurisdictions, dog walking businesses must be licensed and have employees trained in animal first aid. Professional dog walking services can be obtained locally or through online referral services. Obtaining a position as a professional dog walker has become more difficult, with applicants having to pass rigorous exams and go through extensive training. However, whether or not licensing or training is required, all dog walkers who walk other people's dogs must be aware of best practices such as using a fixed-length leash and weather considerations.

In the United States, the first professional dog walker is believed to have been Jim Buck, who in 1960 launched his dog walking service in New York City.

See also
 Pet sitting
 Pet taxi
 Dog daycare

References

External links
 

Walking
Walking
Walking
Physical exercise
Articles containing video clips